Takao Nogami (born 10 July 1971) is a Japanese professional golfer.

Nogami plays on the Japan Golf Tour, where he has won once.

Professional wins (3)

Japan Golf Tour wins (1)

Asia Golf Circuit wins (1)
1998 Mitsubishi Motors Southwoods Open

Other wins (1)
2000 Kyusyu Open

External links

Japanese male golfers
Japan Golf Tour golfers
Sportspeople from Fukuoka Prefecture
1971 births
Living people